Project Grizzly may refer to:

Project Grizzly (film), 1996 film
Project Grizzly (software)